The Nevill Feast is a single-movement orchestral composition by the American composer Christopher Rouse.  The work was commissioned by the Boston Pops Orchestra and completed in February 2003.  It was first performed May 7, 2003 by conductor Keith Lockhart and the Boston Pops Orchestra, both to whom the work is dedicated.

Composition
The Nevill Feast is composed in a single movement and has a duration of roughly 8 minutes.  The work is inspired by great feasts of the Middle Ages and Renaissance, specifically that of the archbishop of York George Neville upon his ascension to the post.  Rouse wrote of this event in the score program notes:
Rouse described the piece as "a brief (...) score intended simply to entertain."

Instrumentation
The work is scored for an orchestra comprising piccolo, two flutes, three oboes, two clarinets, bass clarinet, three bassoons (3rd doubling contrabassoon), four French horns, three trumpets, three trombones, tuba, harp, electric bass, timpani, three percussionists, and strings.

Reception
Mark Kanny of the Pittsburgh Tribune-Review remarked that the piece "takes a noted Medieval English celebration as an excuse for party music." He continued, "The jaunty main theme — very simple and repeated a lot — is offset by contrasting ideas, one of which includes a bass guitar part."  Gabriel Kanengiser of The Oberlin Review was more critical, however, writing, "The piece featured uninteresting melodies that were not executed with the virtuosity expected of Conservatory students, but with the virtuosity of a practical joke—a joke completely missed by the audience."

References

Compositions by Christopher Rouse
2003 compositions
Compositions for symphony orchestra
Music commissioned by the Boston Pops Orchestra